Beembe or Bembe may be:
Bembe people
Bembe language (Ibembe)
Beembe tribe (Kongo)
Bembe language (Kibembe)